Gonzalo del Campo or Lopez de Ocampo (Died October 15, 1627) was a Roman Catholic prelate who served as Archbishop of Lima (1625–1627).

Biography
On October 2, 1623, Pope Urban VIII, appointed Gonzalo del Campo, the fifth Archbishop of Lima. On March 10, 1624, he was consecrated bishop by Luis Fernández de Córdoba, Archbishop of Santiago de Compostela and installed August 20, 1625.  He served as Archbishop of Lima until his death on October 15, 1627.

While bishop, he was the principal Consecrator of Francisco Sotomayor, Bishop of Cartagena.

See also
Catholic Church in Peru

References

External links and additional sources
 (for Chronology of Bishops) 
 (for Chronology of Bishops) 
Don Gonzalo del Campo. Canónigo de Sevilla y Arzobispo de Lima. Por Patiño Castañeda Delgado. Universidad Internacional de Andalucía.

1627 deaths
Bishops appointed by Pope Urban VIII
University of Salamanca alumni
17th-century Roman Catholic bishops in Peru
Roman Catholic archbishops of Lima